Lorena Andrea Mateo (born 12 April 1994) is a British actress. She is known for her role as Sister Lilith in the Netflix fantasy series Warrior Nun (2020–2022).

Early life
Andrea was born in North London Borough of Camden to Spanish and Colombian parents and speaks fluent English and Spanish. She lived in Spain for three years before returning to England. She was a competitive swimmer growing up and a member of Anaconda Swimming Club near Tufnell Park. She took acting classes at the Anna Scher Theatre. She appeared in the CBBC show The Pod in 2007.

Career
In 2016, Andrea joined the cast of her first feature film Jesters as Sofia, a Colombian student, which premiered in 2018. She also co-starred in the 2017 films Unhinged and House on Elm Lake. That same year, she appeared in Michael Noer's 2017 rendition of the 1973 classic Papillon as Lali, a Wayuu Indian woman who rescues Papillon Charlie Hunnam and nurses him back to health. Andrea starred as Lotsee opposite Chris Routhe in the 2019 western No Man's Land. In 2020, she began starring as Sister Lilith in the Netflix fantasy series Warrior Nun. She has an upcoming role in the 2023 live-action film adaptation of Disney's The Little Mermaid.

Filmography

Film

Television

Stage

References

External links 
 
 Lorena Andrea at Spotlight

Living people
1994 births
Actresses from London
British actors of Latin American descent
English people of Colombian descent
English people of Spanish descent
People from the London Borough of Camden